Barry Kelly (born 1970) is an Irish hurling referee. Born in Mullingar, County Westmeath, he went on to become one of the top referees in his sport and has officiated at several All-Ireland finals in minor, under-21 and senior levels. He is a member of the St Oliver Plunkett's club in Mullingar. He is an English, History and CSPE teacher at St Finian's College in Mullingar.

Kelly has refereed four All-Ireland Senior Hurling Championship Finals - 2006, 2008, 2012, and 2014.
He has twin sons, Manus and Theobald. His wife Catherine died after a brief illness at St. James's Hospital in 2013.

References

1970 births
Living people
All-Ireland Senior Hurling Championship Final referees
Hurling referees
Irish schoolteachers
Sportspeople from County Westmeath
Teachers of English